Ultra.2012 is a dance compilation album from Ultra Records, compiling original and remixed tracks from the label. It was released on November 8, 2011.  The album features a wide array of popular dance and electronic artists.

Track listing 
Disc One:
"Mr. Saxobeat (Extended Mix)" - Alexandra Stan
"Addiction (Extended Mix)" - Medina
"Cinema (Skrillex Remix)" - Benny Benassi feat. Gary Go
"Raise Your Weapon" - deadmau5
"Love Is Darkness (Original Mix)" - Sander van Doorn feat. Carol Lee
"Eyes (Extended Mix)" - Kaskade feat. Mindy Gledhill
"Feel So Close (Extended Mix)" - Calvin Harris
"What a Feeling (Extended Mix)" - Alex Gaudino feat. Kelly Rowland
"Forever (Extended Mix)" - Wolfgang Gartner feat. will.i.am
"Loca People (US Clean Edit)" - Sak Noel
"Sun Is Up (Play & Win Radio Edit)" - Inna
"Throw Your Hands Up (Dancar Kuduro)" - Qwote feat. Pitbull & Lucenzo

Disc Two:
"Where You Wanna Go (Original Mix)" - Mischa Daniels feat. J-Son
"Welcome to St. Tropez (DJ Antoine vs Mad Mark Clean Remix)" - DJ Antoine vs. Timati feat. Kalenna
"You Just Don't Love Me (Extended Mix)" - David Morales & Jonathan Mendelsohn
"Sun & Moon (Club Mix)" - Above & Beyond feat. Richard Bedford
"Feel It (Original Extended Mix)" - Ferry Corsten
"Niton (The Reason) (Extended)" - Eric Prydz
"Boy (Hardwell Remix)" - Adrian Lux feat. Rebecca & Fiona
"No Beef" - Afrojack & Steve Aoki feat. Miss Palmer
"Natural Disaster (Original)" - Laidback Luke vs Example
"Drowning (Avicii Remix)" - Armin van Buuren feat. Laura V
"Little Bird (Extended Mix)" - Kim Sozzi
"Alone Again (Original Mix)"- Alyssa Reid feat. Jump Smokers

References

External links
Album Site at Ultra Records

2012 compilation albums
Dance music compilation albums
Ultra Records albums